Barotac Viejo, officially the Municipality of Barotac Viejo,  is a 3rd class municipality in the province of Iloilo, Philippines. According to the 2020 census, it has a population of 48,614 people.

Geography
Barotac Viejo is in the northern part of the Province of Iloilo, facing the strait of Guimaras and the island of Negros. It is bounded on the north by San Rafael, on the west by Banate, on the south by the Visayan Sea, and on the east by Ajuy.

Topography and land features
A range of sprawling hills and high mountains occupy three quarters of the land of Barotac Viejo. Mount Agumid on the northern boundary with San Rafael is the highest mountain, at about 550 meter high.

The town is divided by a long mountain range dividing it into the upper and lower regions. The upper region is approximately 1,000 feet above sea level. The climate is generally cooler than ordinary and rain is more abundant. The lower region is compose of rice producing areas. This part is near the sea and is well populated.

Water sources
Barotac Viejo has 2 rivers, namely the Barotac Viejo River and the Barotac Cayo River. It has several creeks or springs.

The Barotac Viejo River is the longest and the widest river passing through the heart of the town. It has never been dry but it sometimes overflows its banks on rainy days. The river is utilized for bathing, laundry and fishing.

The municipality has approximately 10 miles of shallow shorelines and nearby are fishponds.

Climate

Rainy season sets in about May and last up to the middle of January. The rainfall in the upper region is comparatively heavier than the lower region. This is due to the chain of high mountains surrounding the place and innumerable springs that flow along the foot of the hills the heaviest rainfall occurs about in the early part of September during the south monsoon. Dry season sets in a little earlier in the lower region than in the upper region.

Barangays

Barotac Viejo is politically subdivided into 26 barangays.

History
In 1957, the sitio of Poscolon in the barrio of Calaigang was converted into a barrio. Surprisingly, the same law was reenacted in 1959, probably indicating resistance to the renaming.

Demographics

Economy

References

External links

 [ Philippine Standard Geographic Code]
 Philippine Census Information
 Local Governance Performance Management System

Municipalities of Iloilo